Allie Will (born April 20, 1991) is an American former tennis player.

Will was born in Boca Raton, Florida. She won eleven doubles titles on the ITF Circuit in her career. On July 22, 2013, she reached her best singles ranking of world No. 293. On February 3, 2014, she peaked at No. 98 in the doubles rankings.

In April 2013, Will made her WTA Tour debut at the 2013 Monterrey Open, alongside Asia Muhammad in doubles, reaching the semifinals.

ITF finals

Singles (0–3)

Doubles (11–6)

References

External links 
 
 

1991 births
Living people
Sportspeople from Boca Raton, Florida
American female tennis players
Florida Gators women's tennis players
21st-century American women
Tennis people from Florida